Marie-Elisabeth Simons (1754–1774) was a Belgian painter and miniaturist. She foremost painted miniature portraits, fruits, flowers and insects.

She was the daughter of painter Jean-Baptiste Simons.

References
 Biographie Nationale Tome 22

1754 births
1774 deaths
Painters from the Austrian Netherlands
Belgian women painters
18th-century women artists